Orthostatic purpura is a skin condition that results from prolonged standing or even sitting with the legs lowered (as in a bus, airplane, or train), which produced edema and a purpuric eruption on the lower extremities.

See also 
 Skin lesion

References 

Vascular-related cutaneous conditions